Wakaya may refer to:

Places
 Wakaya Island, a privately owned island in Lomaiviti Archpelago in Fiji
 Wakaya people, an Australian Aboriginal people of the Northern Territory
 Wakaya language, an extinct Australian Aboriginal language